Norrland terrain is a geomorphic unit covering the bulk of Norrland and the northwestern half of Svealand. Except for The High Coast the coastal areas of Norrland do not belong to the Norrland terrain. The southern and eastern boundary of the Norrland terrain is made up of geological faults that disrupt the Sub-Cambrian peneplain found the lowlands. In some locations these faults have been extensively eroded making the Norrland terrain boundary partly a result of erosion. Karna Lidmar-Bergström categorizes the Norrland Terrain into the following classes: 
Highlands with well developed valleys above 500 m.a.s.l.
Plains with residual hills of Northern Sweden 
Undulating hilly land of Övertorneå/Överkalix
Undulating hilly land of Boden area
Large scale joint valley landscapes
Plains with residual hills of Dalarna
Undulating hilly land of central Sweden

Phytogeography and soils
From the south the entrance to the Norrland terrain is not only seen in the relief but in the vast and contiguous boreal forests that extend north of it. These forests are known in Sweden as Norra barrskogsregionen (lit. the northern conifer forest region). The southern boundary of the Norrland terrain was identified as a major phytogeographical boundary by Rutger Sernander. For example, the boundary coincides with the northernmost extension of natural grown oaks. The phytogeographical boundary is not fully sharp as valleys of the Norrland terrain constitute transition zones for vegetation. Till and peat are the overwhelmingly commonest soil types.

Gallery

See also
Central Swedish lowland
South Swedish highlands
Sub-Cambrian peneplain

Notes

References

Geography of Sweden
Norrland